Capoccia is an Italian surname. Notable people with the surname include:

 Giovanni Capoccia, Italian professor of political science
 Niccolà di Capoccia (died 1368), also known as Nicola Capocci, Italian cardinal

Italian-language surnames